Les Douze Premières Chansons de Léo Ferré (English: The Twelve First Songs of Léo Ferré) is an album by Léo Ferré, released in 1969 by Barclay Records. The singer records once again the songs he taped in 1950 on behalf of the label Le Chant du Monde, for 78s releases. Back then he had accompanied himself on the piano and technical conditions weren't top-notch. For this release Ferré is backed by a studio orchestra and delivers the songs with plain charismatic vocal maturity.

This album has a lot of tasteful accordion and jazz hints, which convey a great frenchness feel.

Track listing
All songs written and composed by Léo Ferré, except three of them.

Original LP

Personnel 
 The orchestra consists of session musicians hired for the recording.

Production 
 Arranger & conductor: Jean-Michel Defaye
 Engineering: Gerhard Lehner
 Executive producer: Richard Marsan
 Artwork: Patrick Ullmann

External links 
 English translation of À Saint-Germain-des-Prés.

References 

Léo Ferré albums
French-language albums
Barclay (record label) albums
1960 albums